William Cargill may refer to:

 William Cargill (Berwick MP) (1813–1894; William Walter Cargill), Conservative Party politician
 William Cargill (New Zealand politician) (1784–1860; William Walter Cargill), Scottish-born New Zealand settler and politician
 William Wallace Cargill (1844–1909), American business executive and founder of Cargill, Inc

See also

 Cargill (surname)
 
 Cargill (disambiguation)
 William (disambiguation)